My-Tv was Italy's first internet television service.  Owned by RCS MediaGroup, Mediobanca and Gruppo Ciancio, it streamed on-demand video content from Milan and Rome that included music and information about events, clubs and shopping.

History
My-Tv was founded in 2000 in Milan by Salvo Mizzi, and it's considered the first Italian web television. In Italy My-Tv programs "have been the only ones to be  by television channels thanks to their huge internet circulation and success". Art director was popular Italian singer-songwriter Lucio Dalla.

See also
 Internet television
 Alternative media
 Citizen journalism

References

Further reading
 Giuseppe Mazzei, Verso il tigitale. Giornalismo tv. Manuale del cambiamento, RAI ERI, Roma 2002 (Italian)
 Luca De Biase, Giorgio Meletti, Bidone.com? Da dove riparte la net economy in Italia, Fazi Editore, Roma 2001 (Italian).
 Louisa Ha, Richard J. Ganahl, Webcasting worldwide: business models of an emerging global medium, LEA's Media Management and Economics Series, Routledge, New Jersey 2007.

External links
Official Website
King365 IPTV Site
Hotstar Watching Tips

Streaming television
Internet properties established in 2000
Online companies of Italy